The Palace of Cerro Castillo (Spanish: Palacio de Cerro Castillo) is the official country retreat and summer residence of the President of Chile. Built in 1929 in the Spanish Colonial Revival style, it is situated atop Cerro Castillo hill located in Viña del Mar and has been designated as a national and municipal historic monument.

History
Constructed in 1929 during the presidency of Carlos Ibáñez del Campo, the Palace of Cerro Castillo was designed by Luis Browne and Manuel Valenzuela in the Spanish Colonial Revival style. The project engineer was Fortunato Castro. The palace was built on a hill whose land was attached to the nearby Callao Military Fort and occupancy of the new building began in 1930. Prior to its construction, the nearby Ex Intendencia served as the Chilean president's country and summer residence. 

Traditionally, the incoming president of Chile spends the night before his or her inauguration in the palace and then returns to it afterwards to sit for a photo portrait with the newly installed cabinet.

Though Cerro Castillo was rarely used by dictator Augusto Pinochet, it did serve as the site of the wedding of Pinochet's son, Marco Antonio, and Soledad Olave. 

The Palace of Cerro Castillo was declared an historic monument by the Viña del Mar municipal council in 2000 and a national historic monument in 2005.

Design
The palace, which has  of floor space, is constructed in three above-ground stories and a basement, which are connected by an internal elevator. It has eight bedrooms, plus other functional and living spaces. 

During the administration of Eduardo Frei Ruiz-Tagle the palace's grounds were expanded and landscaped; they are currently open for public visiting.

See also
La Moneda -  the seat of the President of the Republic of Chile in Santiago.

References

Buildings and structures in Valparaíso Region
Government of Chile
National Monuments of Chile
Official residences in Chile
Houses in Chile
Houses completed in 1930
Tourist attractions in Valparaíso Region
Spanish Colonial Revival architecture in Chile